Guiglo Airport  is an airport serving Guiglo, Côte d'Ivoire.

See also
Transport in Côte d'Ivoire

References

 OurAirports - Guiglo
 Great Circle Mapper - Guiglo
 Google Earth

Airports in Ivory Coast
Buildings and structures in Montagnes District
Cavally Region